His Majesty's Loyal Opposition, commonly called the Official Opposition, in New Zealand is usually the largest political party or coalition which is not a member of the ruling government—it does not provide ministers. This is usually the second-largest party in the House of Representatives, although in certain unusual circumstances it may be the largest party (due to a larger government bloc) or even a third or fourth party.

The Official Opposition forms a shadow cabinet headed by the Leader of the Opposition and comprising senior MPs with the same portfolio interests as the government's ministers. Unlike in the United Kingdom, where members of the shadow cabinet are called "shadow ministers," the members of New Zealand's shadow cabinet are called "opposition spokespeople."

Overview
The Opposition aims to hold the government accountable and to present itself to the national electorate as a credible government in waiting. For example, during Question Time, Opposition spokespersons will ask questions of ministers with the aim of highlighting a weakness or embarrassing the government. Oppositions also engage in parliamentary gestures such as refusal to grant confidence or voting down the budget.

With the introduction of MMP in 1996 (after referendums in 1992 and 1993), there was consideration to remove the official role of the Opposition; with several parties outside the government, it was no longer clear which party, if any, was the Official Opposition. This is complicated more by parties which occasionally act with the government and at other times vote against it. The unusual positioning that developed after the 2005 election – in which minor parties supported the government and received ministers but remained outside the Cabinet – further complicated the concept of 'opposition'. However, the continued dominance of the political scene by the National and Labour parties means that the Official Opposition has been retained, and inevitably the Official Opposition is whichever of the National and Labour parties is not leading a government at the time. Parties and members of parliament outside the government which do not work with the Official Opposition party are said to "sit on the cross-benches".

Grand coalitions have been formed only twice in New Zealand, and on both occasions with the aim of forming a national response to a crisis. The first was the War Cabinet of 1915–1919, involving the Reform and Liberal Parties, under the leadership of Reform Prime Minister William Massey. The second was the Coalition Government of 1931–1935 to combat the Great Depression, between the United Party (successor to the Liberal Party) and the Reform Party, and led by United leader George Forbes. In both cases, Labour formed the official Opposition. (It is however anachronistic to speak of a Labour Party until 1916; in 1915, the handful of MPs who were to become part of the Labour Party had been elected as "independent" candidates on behalf of several different social-democratic organisations.)

The National Party currently form the Official Opposition.

Shadow Cabinet

List of Shadow Cabinets
Below is a list of the shadow cabinets of New Zealand from 1965 to the present date.

References

Politics of New Zealand
Parliamentary opposition